Park Pobedy, literally meaning "Victory Park" in Russian, may refer to:

 Park Pobedy (Moscow Metro), a metro station
 Park Pobedy (Saint Petersburg Metro), a metro station

See also
Victory Park (disambiguation)